Tarcenay is a former commune in the Doubs department in the Bourgogne-Franche-Comté region in eastern France. On 1 January 2019, it was merged into the new commune Tarcenay-Foucherans.

Geography

Population

See also
 Communes of the Doubs department

References

External links

 Tarcenay on the regional Web site 

Former communes of Doubs